In human anatomy, the facial skeleton of the skull the external surface of the mandible is marked in the median line by a faint ridge, indicating the mandibular symphysis (Latin: symphysis menti) or line of junction where the two lateral halves of the mandible typically fuse at an early period of life (1-2 years). It is not a true symphysis as there is no cartilage between the two sides of the mandible.

This ridge divides below and encloses a triangular eminence, the mental protuberance, the base of which is depressed in the center but raised on either side to form the mental tubercle. The lowest (most inferior) end of the mandibular symphysis — the point of the chin — is called the "menton".

It serves as the origin for the geniohyoid and the genioglossus muscles.

Other animals

Solitary mammalian carnivores that rely on a powerful canine bite to subdue their prey have a strong mandibular symphysis, while pack hunters delivering shallow bites have a weaker one. When filter feeding, the baleen whales, of the suborder Mysticeti, can dynamically expand their oral cavity in order to accommodate enormous volumes of sea water.  This is made possible thanks to its mandibular skull joints, especially the elastic mandibular symphysis which permits both dentaries to be rotated independently in two planes. This flexible jaw, which made the titanic body sizes of baleen whales possible, is not present in early whales and most likely evolved within Mysticeti.

References

Notes

Sources

 

Bones of the head and neck